Frederiksberg Alliancen 2000, commonly referred to as FA 2000, is a professional association football club based in the area of Frederiksberg, Capital Region, Denmark, that competes in the Danish 2nd Division, the third tier of the Danish football league system. Founded in 2000, it is affiliated to the regional association DBU Copenhagen. The team plays its home matches at Frederiksberg Idrætspark, where it has been based since its foundation.

The club was founded on 7 September 2000 as a merger between B 1972, Boldklubben Dalgas and Frederiksberg Kammeraternes IF. While B 1972 and Frederiksberg Kammeraterne were non-league clubs, Dalgas had previously competed one season in the third tier.

History
The club made its official debut in the seventh tier KBU Series 2 in the spring of 2000, where promotion was to KBU Series 1 in the first season. Since then, ambitions have been great at the club, despite struggling to live up to these in the first years. The club was close to reaching promotion in 2003, where former Silkeborg IF player Torben Jørgensen was in charge of FA 2000, but afterwards a couple of chaotic seasons followed, and in 2006 they were only a single point from suffering relegation from the Series 1.

At that point, in the autumn season of 2006, former FC Copenhagen player Iørn Uldbjerg was appointed as new head coach of the team. Under him, the team quietly moved the team away from the bottom and towards the top half of the league, but in the decisive match in 2008 in Fælledparken they lost 3–2 to BK Viktoria in a dramatic match, where FA 2000 led 2–0 at half-time. In 2009, the tournament was rescheduled to start in the autumn, giving half a season with a golden opportunity for promotion, but many player departures during the winter break meant that FA 2000 had to settle for an 8th place. However, the team managed to qualify for the main round of the Danish Cup for the first time in the club's short history.

The disappointment meant that the club board decided to form a sports committee to take care of the development of the club, and the committee's first task was to hire Carsten Rust as the new head coach. He had led KFUMs Boldklub to the fifth tier Copenhagen Series, and for long it looked like he would repeat the feat at FA 2000. However, a long decline during spring ended up costing dearly. A 2–1 defeat at Dragør Boldklub four rounds before the end of the competition cost the promotion. The debut match for Rust had been in the 1st round of the Danish Cup against Allerød FK from the third tier Danish 2nd Division, where they lost 0–2. Rust decided to step down after the season due to private reasons.

Current squad

References

External links
  

 
Association football clubs established in 2000
Football clubs in Denmark
Frederiksberg Municipality
2000 establishments in Denmark